The 2020–21 Stanford Cardinal men's basketball team represented Stanford University during the 2020–21 NCAA Division I men's basketball season. The Cardinal were led by fifth year head coach Jerod Haase and are a member of the Pac-12 Conference. They originally planned to play their home games at Maples Pavilion, but due to COVID-19 regulations by Santa Clara County, California, they cancelled five games and then moved the rest of their home games to Kaiser Permanente Arena in Santa Cruz, California.

Previous season
The Cardinal finished the 2019–20 season 20–11, 9–9 in Pac-12 play to finish in seventh place. They lost in the first round of the Pac-12 tournament to the tenth seed California 51–63, finishing their year because of the COVID-19 pandemic, cancelling post-season tournaments.

Offseason

Departures

2020 recruiting class

2021 Recruiting class

Roster

Schedule and results

|-
!colspan=12 style=| Regular season

|-
!colspan=12 style=| Pac-12 tournament

References

Stanford Cardinal men's basketball seasons
Stanford
Stanford